The 1969 U.S. Pro Tennis Championships was a men's professional tennis tournament played on outdoor hard courts at the Longwood Cricket Club in Chestnut Hill, Massachusetts in the United States. The existing grass courts at Longwood were replaced for the tournament with a slower and higher bouncing green synthetic hardcourt (Uniturf)). It was the 42nd edition of the tournament, the second edition of the Open Era, and was held from July 9 through July 15, 1969. First-seeded Rod Laver won the singles title, his fourth consecutive title at the event and fifth in total, and earned $8,000 first-prize money.

Finals

Singles

 Rod Laver defeated  John Newcombe 7–5, 6–2, 4–6, 6–1

Doubles
 Pancho Gonzales /  Rod Laver defeated  John Newcombe /  Tony Roche 6–4, 5–7, 6–4

See also
 Laver–Rosewall rivalry

References

External links
 ITF tournament edition details
 Longwood Cricket Club – list of U.S. Pro Champions

U.S. Pro Tennis Championships
U.S. Pro Championships
U.S. Pro Championships
U.S. Pro Tennis Championships
U.S. Pro Tennis Championships
Chestnut Hill, Massachusetts
History of Middlesex County, Massachusetts
Sports in Middlesex County, Massachusetts
Tennis tournaments in Massachusetts
Tourist attractions in Middlesex County, Massachusetts